Frank Santillo (October 8, 1912 – June 30, 1978) was an American film editor who won the Academy Award for Best Film Editing for Grand Prix in 1966. He was an associate of Slavko Vorkapich and Peter Ballbusch at MGM during the 1930s and 1940s and was known for his creative montage work. He was under contract as an editor at MGM from 1956 to 1966.

He died in his sleep in Los Angeles.

References

Further reading
 Hoggan notes Santillo's editing of The Outrage (1964) as an example of presenting a single event in a film using the differing perspectives of witnesses; the film was an adaptation of the earlier film Rashomon (1950).

External links

1912 births
1978 deaths
American film editors
Best Film Editing Academy Award winners